NE, Ne or ne may refer to:

Arts and entertainment
 Neutral Evil, an alignment in the American role-playing game Dungeons & Dragons
 New Edition, an American vocal group
 Nicomachean Ethics, a collection of ten books by Greek philosopher Aristotle

Businesses and organizations
 National Express, an English public transport operator
 Natural England, an English government agency
 New England Patriots, a professional American football team in Foxborough, Massachusetts
 New Hope (Macau), a Macau political party
 SkyEurope Airlines, a Slovakian airline
 New Era Cap Company, an American headwear company

Language
 Ne (cuneiform), a cuneiform sign
 Ne (kana), a Japanese written character
 Nepali language
 Modern English, sometimes abbreviated NE (to avoid confusion with Middle English)

Places
 NE postcode area, UK, a postcode for the City of Newcastle upon Tyne, Tyne and Wear
 Ne, Liguria, Italy, a comune in the Province of Genoa
 Né (river), a river in southwestern France
 Near East
 Niger, ISO 3166-1 country code
 .ne, the country code top level domain (ccTLD) for Niger
 Canton of Neuchâtel, a canton of Switzerland
 Nebraska, US (postal abbreviation)
 New England, a region of the United States consisting of six states

Science and technology

Computing
 .ne, the country code top level domain (ccTLD) for Niger
 ne (text editor), a console text editor
 NE (complexity), a class in computational complexity theory
 Network element, a manageable logical entity uniting one or more physical devices
 New Executable, a computer file format

Other uses in science and technology
 Electron density
 Ne, effective population size
 Ne, for Number English, a unit of measure for cotton fiber
 Inequality operator, a term used in programming languages as a "not equal to" operator
 Nash equilibrium, a solution concept in game theory
 Neon, symbol Ne, a chemical element
 Norepinephrine, a neurotransmitter

Other uses
 N.E. and N.E.2d, abbreviations for North Eastern Reporter, US law reports
 Né, indicating the name given to a male child at birth, equivalent to the feminine née
 Nationalencyklopedin, a Swedish national encyclopedia
 Nitro Express, a brand of rifle cartridges
 Northeast (direction), one of the four ordinal directions